The Hasty Pudding Theatricals, known informally simply as The Pudding, is a theatrical student society at Harvard University, known for its burlesque crossdressing musicals. The Hasty Pudding is the oldest theatrical organization in the United States and the third oldest in the world, behind only the Comédie-Française and the Oberammergau Passion Play. The Hasty Pudding Theatricals was described by John Wheelwright in 1897 as a "kindly association of men of all ages in a gay evening of simple enjoyment." It is a comedy show.

History

Formed in 1795 as a social club for Harvard College students, the Hasty Pudding was formed to "cultivate the social affections and cherish the feelings of friendship & patriotism [...]".  Soon after, Pudding members began hosting mock trials of such phenomena as timely Harvard presidents and the study of mathematics. On December 13, 1844, the Pudding put up its first full performance, of a well-known tragic burlesque entitled Bombastes Furioso. After a period of producing popular comedies written by established playwrights, students at Harvard who were members of the Pudding began to write their own shows, starting with a production of Dido and Aeneas written by Owen Wister in 1882. It has performed a production every year since, except two years during World War I and two years during World War II.

Previous members of Hasty Pudding have included John Adams, John Quincy Adams, Theodore Roosevelt, Franklin Delano Roosevelt, J.P. Morgan, Oliver Wendell Holmes, William Randolph Hearst, lyricist Alan Jay Lerner, Oscar winner Jack Lemmon, humorist Andy Borowitz, artist Henry Ives Cobb Jr., actress Rashida Jones, and former Massachusetts governor William Weld. Although women were a part of the company in the role of costumers for many years prior to this, In 1948, Felisa Vanoff (1925–2014) became the first female choreographer of the company. In 1978, Diane Nabatoff became the first female Producer of the show. In 2009, Megan Amram and Alexandra Petri became the first all-female team to write the show.

Although the cast of the show had traditionally been all-male, on January 25, 2018, then-President Amira Weeks announced that the cast would officially go co-ed beginning with the company's 171st production. However, the technical, band, creative, and business boards had also historically been co-ed. The 171st Hasty Pudding Show, entitled France France France Revolution, marked the first ever show with women in the cast. Under the helm of then-President Grace Ramsey and Cast Vice President David Lynch, the cast was evenly divided, with six men and six women; furthermore, sticking to Hasty Pudding tradition, the gender of the actor was not necessarily taken into account whilst casting the show (in fact, 8 of the performers were in drag, and 4 were not). The show was well reviewed and, since, the cast has been constructed without taking gender into account.

Each spring, the Pudding's Theatricals holds a 5-week run in Cambridge, Massachusetts, and then tours to New York City and Bermuda.

The Pudding is, maybe paradoxically, both a museum for antique theatrical practices and a magnet or training ground for innovative new talents.  On the one hand its deliberately retro theatrical trappings (a once all-male cast; all-live pit orchestra with no computers or synthesizers; silly plots full of crude jokes, low-tech production values, collegiate humor and anachronistic puns) seem to preserve a museum-piece approach to musical theater.

Yet for decades the Pudding has been incubating new talents at a steadily increasing rate, and is often compared in this way to other influential collegiate theatre groups such as Carnegie Mellon University's Scotch'n'Soda Theatre. Pudding graduates are leaders in the fields of writing, directing, and performing in theater, television, movies and the other arts. At least three winners of the prestigious annual Ed Kleban Award for achievement in lyric writing have each been Pudding graduates.  Pudding librettist Mark O'Donnell won a Tony Award in 2003 for co-authoring the book for Hairspray. He also co-authored the book for the Broadway musical Cry-Baby; its lyrics were penned by fellow Pudding alum David Javerbaum, who has since won 13 Emmy Awards, including 11 as head writer for The Daily Show—which also featured comedian Mo Rocca, a former Pudding librettist and President. Pudding actor Jerry Colker won the Drama Desk Award for authoring the book for the Off-Broadway musical Three Guys Naked From the Waist Down. Actress Rashida Jones (seen in Parks and Recreation, The Office, Boston Public, and the film I Love You, Man) co-composed the score of the show during her senior year. Paris Barclay wrote two Pudding shows and is now an Emmy-winning director and producer for dozens of film and television projects including NYPD Blue, Sons of Anarchy and Glee, and in 2013 was elected President of the Directors Guild of America. Pudding actor and composer Laurence O'Keefe wrote the music and lyrics for the Off-Broadway shows Bat Boy: The Musical and Heathers: The Musical.  O'Keefe co-wrote the score to the Broadway musical Legally Blonde with his wife, Pudding librettist Nell Benjamin, who herself wrote the award-winning play The Explorers Club and is currently collaborating with Tina Fey on the musical adaptation of the film Mean Girls.  Pudding bookwriter Mark O'Keefe co-wrote and co-produced the movies Bruce Almighty and Click. Pudding librettist Megan Amram became famous shortly after graduating for her comic Twitter feed and now writes for television shows like Parks and Recreation and Silicon Valley, and her co-writer Alexandra Petri now writes a regular column for the Washington Post, a newspaper. BJ Averell, a Pudding actor alumnus, was a Grand Prize winner of The Amazing Race and is also an accomplished sea captain. John Berman, a Pudding actor and President, is now a news anchor for CNN.

Notable alumni
 John Adams, US President
 John Quincy Adams, US President
 BJ Averell, a Grand Prize winner of The Amazing Race
 Megan Amram
 Paris Barclay, Emmy-winning director and producer for dozens of film and television projects including NYPD Blue, Sons of Anarchy and Glee, and in 2013 was elected President of the Directors Guild of America
 Nell Benjamin, who herself wrote the award-winning play The Explorers Club
 John Berman, news anchor for CNN
 Andy Borowitz, humorist
 Josh Brener, actor in Silicon Valley, Maron, and The Big Bang Theory, and former Pudding President
 Francis Cabot, American financier, gardener and horticulturist
 Henry Ives Cobb Jr., artist
 Jerry Colker, who won the Drama Desk Award for authoring the book for the Off-Broadway musical Three Guys Naked From the Waist Down
 Fred Gwynne, Actor
 William Randolph Hearst, newspaper publisher
 Rashida Jones, actress in Parks and Recreation, The Office, Boston Public, and the film I Love You, Man
 Oliver Wendell Holmes Sr., physician, poet, and polymath
 David Javerbaum, playwright who has won 13 Emmy Awards, including 11 as head writer for The Daily Show
 Jack Lemmon, Oscar winner
 Alan Jay Lerner lyricist and librettist notable for collaboration with Frederick Loewe
 J.P. Morgan Jr., financier
 Dean Norris, actor in Breaking Bad and Under the Dome
 Mark O'Donnell, librettist who won a Tony Award in 2003 for co-authoring the book for Hairspray
Michael O'Hare, Actor
 Laurence O'Keefe, actor and composer, wrote the music and lyrics for the Off-Broadway shows Bat Boy: The Musical and Heathers: The Musical
 Mark O'Keefe, co-wrote and co-produced the movies Bruce Almighty and Click
 Alexandra Petri
 Joe Raposo, composer, songwriter, pianist; for stage, screen, television Sesame Street etc.
 Mo Rocca, comedian and former Pudding librettist and president
 Franklin Delano Roosevelt, US President
 Theodore Roosevelt, US President
 Felisa Vanoff (1925–2014), who became the company's first female choreographer in 1948 (although women had been included as costumers for many years prior)
 William Weld, former Governor of Massachusetts
 Fairfax Henry Wheelan, American businessman, philanthropist, and political reformer.
 Owen Wister, novelist and biographer

Origins of name
The Hasty Pudding name comes from a Colonial era (originally British) dish called hasty pudding, a kind of porridge made from cornmeal with molasses, honey or other ingredients, a New World cousin to the Italian polenta; called "hasty" because it is cheap and easy to make. It is not clear whether the dish was originally a staple or a dessert, but it is now served for dessert at the banquets thrown by the Pudding, such as opening night celebrations and the annual 'roasts' for their Man/Woman of the Year (see below).

Honorary awards
The society is notable for their annual selection of famous entertainers as Woman of the Year (since 1951) and Man of the Year (since 1967). These awards are usually treated with great seriousness by the honorees, who, since the unanticipated personal appearance of Jane Fonda to accept her award in 1961, always attend the awards ceremony, and are treated to a celebratory "roast," and a parade.

Symbols 

Over the course of its rich history, the Hasty Pudding Theatricals has adopted many significant symbols. The Hasty Pudding Theatricals has two official logos. The first is a sphinx holding a pudding pot. The second is a pudding pot depicted hanging over a fire. The Hasty Pudding Theatricals main color is a deep blue; crimson is used due to its ties with Harvard University, green due to its connection with the Harvard Krokodiloes (an all-male a cappella group spun out from the Hasty Pudding company), and yellow for its connection with the Hasty Pudding Club, a social organization on campus from which the Theatricals was founded. The shade of yellow used by the club is an ode to the color of traditional hasty pudding. The Hasty Pudding Theatricals, Hasty Pudding Club, and Harvard Krokodiloes are all organizations of the Hasty Pudding Institute of 1770 and share the same meeting space and social events on Harvard's campus.

Mottos 
Concordia Discors is the official motto of the Hasty Pudding, literally meaning: Discordant Harmony, or organized chaos, in English.

References

External links
 Hasty Pudding Theatricals Official Website
 Hasty Pudding Theatricals Official History

Harvard University
Cultural history of Boston
1795 establishments in Massachusetts
Harvard Square
Organizations established in 1795